Marist St Pats (MSP) are a rugby union club who play in Wellington Rugby Football Union's premier club rugby grade The Jubilee Cup.

History
Since its formation in 1971, Marist St Pats has won Wellington club rugby's most coveted prize, the Jubilee Cup, 13 times. More than any other club over that time.

External links
Official website
Official Facebook page

New Zealand rugby union teams
Sport in the Wellington Region